Wabowden is a community in northern Manitoba. It is situated on Provincial Trunk Highway No. 6, which is the main route between Thompson and the provincial capital, Winnipeg.

History
The community originated in the early 20th century as a service point on the Hudson Bay Railway. Although the railway's presence in Wabowden has diminished over time, it continues to serve the community by transporting freight and passengers to the Wabowden railway station.

Wabowden's name is derived from that of a one-time railway executive, W.A. Bowden.

Demographics 

Climate
In spite of its latitude below the 55th parallel, Wabowden has a clear-cut rather than borderline subarctic climate. Its climate is dominated by its long and bitterly cold winters, but the short summers are relatively warm, keeping Wabowden well below the tree line.

Mining
Crowflight Minerals is currently preparing Bucko Lake Mine for rehabilitation.  The mine shaft was developed in the 1970s by Falconbridge Limited.

Local media

 CBWMT (channel 10) (CBC)

References

External links
 Community of Wabowden

Designated places in Manitoba
Mining communities in Manitoba
Northern communities in Manitoba
Hudson's Bay Company trading posts
Unincorporated communities in Northern Region, Manitoba